Ardmore is a train station in Ardmore, Oklahoma, United States. It is served by Amtrak's Heartland Flyer train. It is located downtown at 251 East Main Street, and is fully wheelchair accessible.  Most of the depot is used as an event center, but a waiting room in the back is open to passengers thirty minutes before the train is scheduled to arrive.

The station was built by the Atchison, Topeka and Santa Fe Railway in 1917, replacing a 1909-built station which had been destroyed by an explosion on September 27, 1915. The Rock Island Railroad also used the depot, and their logo is still visible on the opposite side from the tracks.

Gallery

References

External links

Texas Eagle page
Amtrak Stations Database
Ardmore, Oklahoma Depot (Santa Fe Surviving Depots)

Amtrak stations in Oklahoma
Atchison, Topeka and Santa Fe Railway stations
Railway stations in the United States opened in 1909